Moultrie Church (1877) is a historic church in St. Johns County, Florida. The church in listed in the National Register of Historic Places.

History 

The small church was built in 1877 and is surrounded with marked and unmarked graves of fallen soldiers. The church was originally founded by Southern Methodists in St. Augustine. It once had the name Wildwood Church. For many years the church was vacant, but in 2014, it was called St. Mary's by the Sea. It was part of the Polish National Catholic Church. The PNCC.

The caretakers of the church are Anthony Hagen and Chrissy Hope.

The church was added to the National Register of Historic Places on September 8, 2014.

References 

Churches in St. Augustine, Florida
National Register of Historic Places in St. Johns County, Florida
1877 establishments in Florida
Houses in St. Johns County, Florida